Belknap Township is a civil township of Presque Isle County in the U.S. state of Michigan.  As of the 2000 census, the township population was 854. The unincorporated community of Hagensville is located in the township.

Geography

Demographics
As of the census of 2000, there were 854 people, 336 households, and 239 families residing in the township.  The population density was 23.9 per square mile (9.2/km2).  There were 397 housing units at an average density of 11.1 per square mile (4.3/km2).  The racial makeup of the township was 98.48% White, 1.05% Native American, 0.12% Asian, 0.12% from other races, and 0.23% from two or more races. Hispanic or Latino of any race were 0.35% of the population.

There were 336 households, out of which 28.6% had children under the age of 18 living with them, 61.9% were married couples living together, 7.1% had a female householder with no husband present, and 28.6% were non-families. 25.6% of all households were made up of individuals, and 13.7% had someone living alone who was 65 years of age or older.  The average household size was 2.51 and the average family size was 3.04.

In the township the population was spread out, with 23.3% under the age of 18, 5.6% from 18 to 24, 24.8% from 25 to 44, 27.5% from 45 to 64, and 18.7% who were 65 years of age or older.  The median age was 42 years. For every 100 females, there were 100.0 males.  For every 100 females age 18 and over, there were 104.0 males.

The median income for a household in the township was $31,875, and the median income for a family was $37,386. Males had a median income of $28,942 versus $19,722 for females. The per capita income for the township was $14,409.  About 4.5% of families and 7.7% of the population were below the poverty line, including 6.7% of those under age 18 and 14.4% of those age 65 or over.

References

Townships in Presque Isle County, Michigan
Townships in Michigan